Valeria Cisternas (born 1 December 1986), better known by her stage name Tomasa Del Real, is a Chilean singer, composer, and reggaetón artist. She is regarded as a pioneer of Neoperreo, a social-media-inspired offshoot of reggaetón, and is referred to as "La Reina del Neoperreo", Spanish for "the queen of Neoperreo").

Early life 
Tomasa was born in Iquique, Chile on 1 December 1986 to an upper-class family. She studied design in Santiago, Chile. Kids at school used to tease her by calling her Tomasa, but she eventually took to the name because it sounded androgynous. She said that she feels like "a man but very much a woman".

Musical career 

During her time working in Iquique as a tattoo artist, Tomasa's mother bought her a laptop. She would record herself singing and rapping with the Photo Booth application and began uploading these videos to Facebook and YouTube. At this time, she would tour the continent giving tattoos to people. It was on these tours where she began performing reggaetón at DIY parties. Her customers worldwide knew about her love for reggaetón. Tattoo customers would invite her to record in their home studios.

In 2015, due to growing success and demand as a performer, Del Real closed her tattoo shop, as she no longer had the time to tend to it.

Del Real released her first album Bien y Mal in March 2016. Many of her earliest songs were included on the album, leading critics to note that despite its DIY spirit, many songs have become some of the best examples for the genre.

Tomasa is a self-described "reggaetón nerd" and researches the genre daily.

Her album Bellaca del Año was released on 18 May 2018 via Nacional Records.

Her album TDR was released on 31 May 2019.

Discography 
Albums
 Bien y Mal (2016)
 Bellaca del Año (2018)
 TDR (2019)

References

External links
Official Facebook Page

Living people
1986 births
Latin music songwriters
21st-century Chilean women singers
Chilean women rappers
Chilean pop singers
Neoperreo musicians